The Journal of Indo-European Studies (JIES) is a peer-reviewed academic journal of Indo-European studies.  The journal publishes papers in the fields of anthropology, archaeology, mythology and linguistics relating to the cultural history of the Indo-European-speaking peoples. It is published every three months. The editor-in-chief is Emily Blanchard West. It also publishes the Journal of Indo-European Studies Monograph Series.

JIES was founded in 1973 by Marija Gimbutas, Edgar C. Polomé, Raimo Aulis Anttila, and Roger Pearson, and published through Pearson's Institute for the Study of Man. Scholars of the far-right have criticised the journal's ongoing association with Pearson, "one of Americas foremost Nazi apologists", and the Institute for the Study of Man, a publisher of "debunked psuedoanthropological claims of a racial Aryanist diaspora". Chip Berlet and Matthew Nemiroff Lyons have described it as a "racialist" and "Aryanist" journal. William H. Tucker notes that, unlike Pearson's other publications (Mankind Quarterly and the Journal of Social, Political and Economic Studies), JIES has not published any articles written by Pearson, and editorial control was left to Gimbutas and Polomé, leaving it the one publication at the [Institute for the Study of Man] of acknowledged academic value. Pearson was on its editorial board for many years, which prompted some scholars to boycott the journal. In 2017, long-time editor J. P. Mallory, whilst rejecting Pearson's views, defended his involvement on the grounds that "democracy should allow researchers to write about crackpot theories" and asked, "if Pearson did not publish the Journal of Indo-European Studies, who would?"

References

External links
Journal of Indo-European Studies
Publication Indices: Journal of Indo-European Studies, archived from the University of Texas at Austin

Indo-European studies
Anthropology journals
Archaeology journals
Linguistics journals
Quarterly journals
English-language journals